Events in the year 1995 in Norway.

Incumbents
 Monarch – Harald V
 Prime Minister – Gro Harlem Brundtland (Labour Party)

Events

 1 January – The Draupner wave in the North Sea in Norway is detected, confirming the existence of rogue waves.
 6 March – Brønnøysunds Avis launches the first online newspaper in Norway.

Full date unknown
 Delphi Funds is founded.
 Norsk Hydro merges its gas stations in Norway and Denmark with the Texaco, creating the joint venture HydroTexaco. The service station chain is sold in 2006 to Reitangruppen.
 Municipal and county elections are held throughout the country.

Anniversaries
6 March – 100 years since the death of Camilla Collett.
12 July – 100 years since the birth of Kirsten Flagstad

Popular culture

Sports
4–5 February – The FIL World Luge Championships 1995 took place at Hunderfossen.
1–5 March – The 1995 World Skeleton Championships and the 1995 World Junior Bobsleigh Championships took place at Hunderfossen.
March – The World Junior Alpine Skiing Championships 1995 took place at Voss.

Music 

 13 May – Norway wins Eurovision Song Contest 1995 with the song "Nocturne", performed by Secret Garden.

Film

Television

Notable births
 
 
 

23 January – Marius Høibråten, footballer
5 February – Thomas Martinussen, footballer
12 February – Kent-Are Antonsen, footballer
13 February – Bård Finne, footballer
18 February – Caroline Graham Hansen, footballer
2 March – Mats Møller Dæhli, footballer
30 March – Anders Trondsen, footballer
7 April – Tiril Sjåstad Christiansen, freestyle skier.
4 May – Martin Ellingsen, footballer.
3 June – Mattias Nørstebø, ice hockey player
26 June – Eirik Hestad, footballer.
26 June – Simen Nordermoen, footballer
7 July – Even Eriksen, politician.
10 July – Ada Hegerberg, footballer
3 August – Jeppe Moe, footballer.
8 August – Malin Reitan, singer
26 August 
 Amalie Eikeland, footballer.
 Herman Stengel, footballer
 Sondre Tronstad, footballer
31 August – Celine Helgemo, singer and songwriter
10 November – Line Høst, competitive sailor.
25 November – Anja Ninasdotter Abusland, politician.

Full date unknown
Andrine Benjaminsen, orienteer and ski orienteer.
 Sebastian Warholm, actor

Notable deaths

6 February – Bjarne Henry Henriksen, politician (born 1904)
15 February – Frieda Dalen, educator (born 1895).
26 February – Kjell Thorbjørn Kristensen, politician (born 1927)
28 February – Ragnvald Mikal Andersen, politician (born 1899)

13 April – Peter Bastiansen, businessperson and politician (born 1912).

4 May – Arne Arnardo, circus performer and owner (born 1912).
16 May – Parelius Hjalmar Bang Berntsen, politician (born 1910)
24 May – Ole Borge, jurist and resistance member (born 1916)
26 May – Sigmund Skard, poet, essayist and professor of literature (born 1903)
30 May – Sunniva Hakestad Møller, politician (born 1907)
31 May – Ingrid Semmingsen, historian, first female professor of history in Norway (born 1910)

5 June – Olav Moen, politician (born 1909)

30 July – Pelle Christensen, actor and translator (born 1923)

28 September – Ottar Fjærvoll, politician (born 1914)

17 October – Gunvor Hofmo, writer and poet (born 1921)
18 October – Torrey Mosvold, shipping and industrial entrepreneur (born 1910)

7 November – Halvor Thorbjørn Hjertvik, politician (born 1914)
10 November – Tormod Førland, chemist (born 1920).
24 November – Benny Motzfeldt, visual artist, glass designer and sculptor (born 1909).
25 November – Leif Juster, comedian, singer and actor (born 1910).
26 November – Sigmund Mjelve, writer (born 1926).

3 December – Hans Aardal, politician (born 1921)
7 December – Benn John Valsø, bobsledder (born 1927)
16 December – Inger Waage, industrial ceramicist (born 1923).

Full date unknown
Otto Chr. Bastiansen, physicist and chemist (born 1918)

See also

References

External links